Ərəkit is a village and municipality in the Ismailli Rayon of Azerbaijan.  It has a population of 1,106. The municipality consists of the villages of Ərəkit, Bağəli, Namazgah, and Kənəə.

References 

Populated places in Ismayilli District